Randy Yeuell Owen (born December 13, 1949) is an American country music artist. He is best known for his role as the lead singer of Alabama, a country rock band that saw tremendous mainstream success throughout the 1980s and 1990s. Alabama became the most successful band in country music, releasing over 20 gold and platinum records, dozens of number 1 singles, and selling over 75 million records during their career. Owen also maintains a career as a solo performer. He released his solo debut One on One in late 2008 and charted two singles from it.

Owen was inducted into the Musicians Hall of Fame and Museum in 2019.

Biography
Randy Yeuell Owen grew up on a farm near Fort Payne, Alabama. He is of English and Scots ancestry. He dropped out of high school in the ninth grade, but he returned and graduated from Fort Payne High in 1969.
In the late 1960s, Owen and his cousin, Teddy Gentry, began playing music together. They recruited another cousin, Jeff Cook, to form a band, which they called Wildcountry. Their first public performance was at a high school talent show, which they won.

Owen's music career was put on hiatus as he earned an English degree from Jacksonville State University. He was also a member of Pi Kappa Phi, Delta Epsilon Chapter. Upon his graduation, however, the three cousins moved into an apartment in Anniston, Alabama, and by 1973 were pursuing a full-time music career. In 1980, the band, now called Alabama, were signed to a recording contract by RCA Records and quickly reached country superstardom. For the next twenty-two years, Alabama had a tremendous impact on country music, attracting a younger group of listeners, crossing over into pop radio, and paving the way for groups to be successful on country radio.

Alabama released 21 gold, platinum, and multi-platinum albums, 42 singles that topped the charts at #1, and sold over 75 million records in total.  They have a star on the Hollywood Walk of Fame and were named the Academy of Country Music's Artist of the Decade in 1989, and the Recording Industry Association of America's Country Group of the Century in 1999.

In May 2002, the band announced their retirement during the Academy of Country Music Awards telecast.  For the rest of 2002 and 2003, they performed throughout the country in their American Farewell Tour.  In 2005, the band was inducted into the Country Music Hall of Fame.

Owen lives on his own cattle ranch outside Fort Payne. He currently serves as an at-large member of the Board of Trustees of Jacksonville State University. In 2007, he was a judge on Season 5 of the country talent show Nashville Star.

Owen took over hosting duties for Country Gold, the Saturday night classic country request program on Westwood One, beginning July 21, 2012. The show was reformatted upon Owen's arrival, switching to a pre-recorded format (the show's predecessor, Country Gold Saturday Night, was originally live; requests are handled, as they had been with Owen's immediate predecessor, by an answering machine) voicetracked from Owen's home, drifting to a more open-ended "traditional country" format (one that includes more 1990s songs and even some 2000s songs along with country-pop tunes more commonly associated with the classic hits format while moving away from the core songs of the classic country format) and shortening the show from five hours to four. (In protest of the change of format, previous Country Gold host Rowdy Yates relaunched his version of the show as "The Original Country Gold" through Compass Media Networks a year later.) Owen ended his run as host on April 2, 2016, with Terri Clark replacing him the following weekend.

Charitable work
From 1982 through 1997, Owen and the other members of Alabama organized an annual Alabama June Jam in Fort Payne, Alabama.  Proceeds from these events were put into an escrow account, which gives grants to charities and school organizations.   In honor of their good works, the group has been the recipient of the Bob Hope Humanitarian Award, Country Radio Broadcasters' Humanitarian Award, and the Minnie Pearl Humanitarian Award. Alabama was also awarded the B.M.I. President's Trophy for Public Service, which has been awarded only four times (and never before to a group).  Owen and his fellow band members were also the inaugural recipients of the "Spirit of Alabama" medal awarded by Governor Bob Riley.

On his own, Owen heavily supports St. Jude Children's Research Hospital.  He established "Country Cares for St. Jude Kids", the annual radiothon that raises money for cancer research in 1989.  This radiothon, one of the most successful radio fundraisers in history, has raised over $800 million for St. Jude's.  He has been honored with the Michael F. Tamer Award by St. Jude's for his continued support.

Owen is also interested in helping disadvantaged children.  Since 1985, his annual golf tournament benefits the Alabama Sheriff's Departments Youth Ranches, and has raised over $1 million.

Owen, and his wife Kelly Owen, were the primary benefactors for the construction of the Kelly Owen Women's and Children's Pavilion at DeKalb Regional Medical Center in Fort Payne, which was at the time a charitably-operated hospital of Baptist Health System of Alabama.

Discography

Studio albums

Singles

Publications
Born Country: My Life in Alabama - How Faith, Family, and Music Brought Me Home.  HarperOne (2008)

References

External links

Alabama Official Website
CMT Interview

1949 births
People from Fort Payne, Alabama
American people of English descent
American people of Scottish descent
American country singer-songwriters
American male singer-songwriters
Living people
Alabama (American band) members
BBR Music Group artists
American people of English descent
Jacksonville State University alumni
American radio personalities
Country Music Hall of Fame inductees
Members of the Country Music Association
Alabama Republicans
Singer-songwriters from Alabama
Judges in American reality television series